Alexandra Sanmark    (b. 1970) is an archaeologist specialising in Iron Age Scandinavia and the Viking Age.

Career
Sanmark took undergraduate and postgraduate study at the University of London before gaining her PhD in 2006 on the Christianisation of Scandinavia from University College London. Sanmark is a Reader in Medieval Archaeology at the University of the Highlands and Islands and Associate Professor of Archaeology at Uppsala University.

She was elected as a Fellow of the Society of Antiquaries of London on 2 February 2010, and as a Fellow of the Royal Historical Society in 2010.

Select publications

Sanmark, A. 2017. Viking Law and Order, Places and Rituals of Assembly in the Medieval North. Edinburgh University Press.
Sanmark, A. 2014. "Christianity, Survival and Re-Emergence", Encyclopedia of Global Archaeology .
Sanmark, A. 2013. "'Patterns of Assembly. Norse Thing Sites in Shetland' Debating the Thing in the North I, Selected Papers from Workshops Organized by The Assembly Project", Journal of the North Atlantic Special Volume 5.
Sanmark, A. and Semple, S. 2013. "Assembly in North West Europe: collective concerns for early societies?", European Journal of Archaeology 16(3).
Carver, M., Sanmark, A., and Semple, S. (eds) 2010. Signals of Belief in Early England: Anglo-Saxon Paganism Revisited. Oxbow.
Sanmark, A. 2009–10. "The Case of the Greenlandic Assembly Sites", Journal of the North Atlantic Special Volume 2, 178–192.

References

British women historians
21st-century British historians
Fellows of the Society of Antiquaries of London
Living people
Fellows of the Royal Historical Society
Medievalists
Alumni of University College London
Academic staff of Uppsala University
1970 births
21st-century archaeologists
British women archaeologists
Medieval archaeologists